The 1946 NCAA Swimming and Diving Championships were contested in March 1946 at the Payne Whitney Gymnasium at Yale University in New Haven, Connecticut at the 10th annual NCAA-sanctioned swim meet to determine the team and individual national champions of men's collegiate swimming and diving in the United States. 

Ohio State topped the team standings for the second consecutive year, capturing the Buckeyes' third national title.

Team standings
Note: Top 10 only
(H) = Hosts
Full results

See also
List of college swimming and diving teams

References

NCAA Division I Men's Swimming and Diving Championships
NCAA Swimming And Diving Championships
NCAA Swimming And Diving Championships